Abu Arabid (also Romanized as Abū ‘Arābīd; also known as Abū ‘Arbīdeh) is a village in Jaffal Rural District, in the Central District of Shadegan County, Khuzestan Province, Iran. At the 2006 census, its population was 648, in 113 families.

References 

Populated places in Shadegan County